Graham Norton is a Gaelic footballer who plays for the St Brigid's club and the Dublin county team.

External links
 Dublin at Hogan Stand

Year of birth missing (living people)
Living people
Dublin inter-county Gaelic footballers
St Brigid's (Dublin) Gaelic footballers